The Malaysian Journal of Nutrition is a triannual peer-reviewed medical journal published by the Nutrition Society of Malaysia. It was established in 1995 and covers nutrition science. The editor-in-chief is Khor Geok Lin.

Abstracting and indexing
The journal is abstracted and indexed in Index Medicus/PubMed/MEDLINE and Scopus.

References

External links
 

Publications established in 1995
Nutrition and dietetics journals
English-language journals
Triannual journals
Health in Malaysia